Chicken Run is a 2000 stop-motion animated adventure comedy film produced by Pathé and Aardman Animations in partnership with DreamWorks Animation. Aardman's first feature-length film, it was directed by Peter Lord and Nick Park from a screenplay by Karey Kirkpatrick and based on an original story by Lord and Park. The film stars the voices of Julia Sawalha, Mel Gibson, Tony Haygarth, Miranda Richardson, Phil Daniels, Lynn Ferguson, Timothy Spall, Imelda Staunton, and Benjamin Whitrow. The plot centres on a group of British anthropomorphic chickens who see an American rooster named Rocky Rhodes as their only hope to escape the farm when their owners want to turn them into meat pies.

Released to critical acclaim, Chicken Run was also a commercial success, grossing over $220 million, becoming the highest-grossing stop-motion animated film in history and the biggest success in DreamWorks Animation history until Shrek in 2001 doubled it.

A sequel, titled Chicken Run: Dawn of the Nugget, is set to be released on Netflix on 10 November 2023.

Plot 

A flock of chickens live on an egg farm in Yorkshire vaguely in the 1950s that is structured like a prison camp. The farm is run by the cruel Mrs. Tweedy and her subservient husband, Mr. Tweedy, who kill and eat any chicken that is no longer able to lay eggs. The chickens constantly devise new ways to try to escape but are always caught. Mr. Tweedy suspects the chickens are organized and plotting resistance, but his wife dismisses his theories while being frustrated with making miniscule profits.

One day, the chickens' leader, Ginger, witnesses an American rooster named Rocky Rhodes crash-land in the farm's coop; the chickens put his sprained wing in a cast and hide him from the Tweedys, who were promised a handsome reward by Rocky's owner for his return. Inspired by Rocky's apparent flying abilities, Ginger begs him to help teach her and the other chickens to fly, so they can escape. Rocky gives them training lessons. That evening, the Tweedys have strange boxes delivered to them which Mrs Tweedy claims would turn the farm into full scale automated production and increase profits. Ginger suspects that the Tweedys plan to kill all the chickens after they increase their food whilst apparently not being concerned that Babs has stopped laying eggs. After Ginger and Rocky get into an argument over alerting the others about the impending prospect of death, Rocky holds a morale-boosting dance party during which it is revealed that his wing is healed; Ginger insists he demonstrates flying the next day, but Mr. Tweedy finishes assembling the machine, which is revealed to make chicken pies, and puts Ginger in it for a test run. Rocky saves her and inadvertently sabotages the machine, buying them time to warn the chickens and plan an escape from the farm.

The next day, Ginger finds Rocky has left, leaving behind part of a poster revealing him as a former cannon stunt actor who is unable to actually fly, depressing her and the others. After a fight breaks out, Ginger is inspired by elderly rooster Fowler's stories of his time in the Royal Air Force to create an aircraft, named the Old Crate, to flee the farm.

With help from Nick and Fetcher (two rats who smuggle contraband in exchange for eggs), the chickens assemble parts for the plane as Mr. Tweedy fixes the machine. Mrs. Tweedy orders Mr. Tweedy to gather all the chickens for the machine, but the chickens attack him, leaving him gagged and bound as they finish the plane. Meanwhile, Rocky encounters a billboard advertising Mrs. Tweedy's chicken pies and returns to the farm out of guilt for abandoning the chickens. An alerted Mrs. Tweedy attacks Ginger as she helps the plane take off but is subdued by Rocky, who leaves with Ginger by holding onto a line of Christmas lights snagged by the departing plane. Mrs. Tweedy follows by climbing up the lights with an axe; Ginger dodges an axe swipe which cuts through the line, sending Mrs. Tweedy falling into the safety valve of the pie machine and causing it to explode. Having freed himself, Mr. Tweedy reminds Mrs. Tweedy of his warning that the chickens were organized, causing her to growl at him until he pushes the still-standing barn door onto her.

The chickens celebrate their victory while Ginger and Rocky kiss, and they fly to an island where they make their home. During the credits, Nick and Fetcher discuss starting their own chicken farm so they can have all the eggs they could eat, but then end up arguing over whether the chicken or the egg should come first on top of a chicken sanctuary "Keep Out" sign.

Voice cast 

 Julia Sawalha as Ginger, the de facto British leader of the chickens who is determined to protect her friends from facing certain death.
 Mel Gibson as Rocky Rhodes, an American circus rooster who crash-lands on the coop and must teach the chickens to fly. Ginger's love interest.
 Miranda Richardson as Mrs. Melisha Tweedy, Mr. Tweedy's evil, greedy, abusive, and power-hungry wife and owner of the farm who wants to make the chickens into pies.
 Tony Haygarth as Mr. Willard Tweedy, Mrs. Tweedy's oafish and hen-pecked husband and owner. Despite his low intelligence, he is more aware of the chickens' escape plans than his wife.
 Benjamin Whitrow as Fowler, a feisty elderly rooster who prattles endlessly about his experiences in  the Royal Air Force.
 Timothy Spall as Nick, a cynical, portly rat who smuggles contraband into the compound.
 Phil Daniels as Fetcher, Nick's slow-witted partner.
 Jane Horrocks as Babs, a chubby and naïve chicken who loves knitting.
 Imelda Staunton as Bunty, the champion egg-layer and group cynic who is sceptical of Ginger's escape plans. 
 Lynn Ferguson as Mac, Ginger's genius Scottish assistant.

Production 

Chicken Run was first conceived in 1995 by Aardman co-founder Peter Lord and Wallace and Gromit creator Nick Park. According to Park, the project started as a spoof on the 1963 film The Great Escape. Chicken Run was Aardman Animations' first feature-length production, which would be executive produced by Jake Eberts. Nick Park and Peter Lord, who run Aardman, directed the film, while Karey Kirkpatrick scripted the film with additional input from Mark Burton and John O'Farrell.

When a chicken speaks, each sound corresponds to a different beak that was placed on the character.

Pathé agreed to finance the film in 1996, putting their finances into script development and model design. DreamWorks officially came on board in 1997. They beat out studios like Disney, 20th Century Fox, and Warner Bros. and largely won due to the perseverance of DreamWorks co-chairman Jeffrey Katzenberg; as a company they were eager to make their presence felt in the animation market in an attempt to compete with Disney's dominance of the field. Katzenberg explained that he had "been chasing these guys for five or six years, ever since I first saw Creature Comforts." DreamWorks secured their first animated feature with the film, and they handled distribution in all territories except Europe, which Pathé handled. The two studios co-financed the film. DreamWorks also retains rights to worldwide merchandising.

Principal photography began on 29 January 1998. During the production of the film, 30 sets were used with 80 animators working along with 180 people working overall. Despite this, one minute of film was completed with each week of filming, production wrapped on 18 June 1999.

John Powell and Harry Gregson-Williams composed the music for the film, which was released on 20 June 2000 under the RCA Victor label.

Reception

Critical response 

The website's critics consensus reads: "Chicken Run has all the charm of Nick Park's Wallace & Gromit, and something for everybody. The voice acting is fabulous, the slapstick is brilliant, and the action sequences are spectacular." At Metacritic the film has a weighted average score of 88 out of 100, based on 34 critics, indicating "universal acclaim". Audiences surveyed by CinemaScore gave the film a grade "A−" on an A+ to F scale.

Roger Ebert of the Chicago Sun-Times gave three and a half stars out of four, writing: "So it truly is a matter of life and death for the chickens to escape from the Tweedy Chicken Farm in Chicken Run, a magical new animated film that looks and sounds like no other. Like the otherwise completely different Babe, this is a movie that uses animals as surrogates for our hopes and fears, and as the chickens run through one failed escape attempt after another, the charm of the movie wins us over."

Chicken Run has been noted for its depiction of feminism, revolution, Marxism, and fascism. According to Florentine StrzeIczyk, Chicken Run points to the way that masculinity and femininity are mediated in popular film genres. It also received attention for its female-led cast. Film School Rejects called the movie feminist, noting that "the stereotypical 'woman's work' of these female chickens (such as their sewing and knitting) is crucial in constructing their mechanism for escape and vital towards the revolution itself." The Islamic Republic of Iran News Network argued it was a way to disguise Zionism and Western propaganda.

Box office 

On opening weekend, the film grossed $17,506,162 for a $7,027 average from 2,491 theatres. Overall, the film placed second behind Me, Myself & Irene. In its second weekend, the film held well as it slipped only 25% to $13,192,897 for a $4,627 average from expanding to 2,851 theatres and finishing in fourth place. The film's widest release was 2,953 theatres, after grossing $106,834,564 domestically with an additional $118,000,000 overseas for a worldwide total of $224,834,564. Produced on an estimated budget of $42–45 million, the film was a huge box office hit. To date, it is still the highest grossing stop motion animated movie.

Accolades

Home media 

Chicken Run was released on VHS and DVD in the United States on November 21, 2000 by DreamWorks Home Entertainment.

Universal Pictures Home Entertainment released Chicken Run on Blu-ray in North America on January 22, 2019.

Sequel 
A sequel to Chicken Run was confirmed on 26 April 2018. It was also announced that Aardman would be reuniting with StudioCanal and Pathé. DreamWorks Animation will have no involvement due to ending their partnership with Aardman after the release of Flushed Away in 2006. Sam Fell is attached to direct, with Paul Kewley and Park producing. The original Chicken Run writers Kirkpatrick and John O'Farrell will return for the sequel. Aardman co-founders Lord and David Sproxton will serve as executive producers.

On 30 June 2020—the 20th anniversary of the film's release in U.K. cinemas—Netflix announced that it had negotiated with Pathé to acquire the rights to the sequel. Fell was able to give more details about the sequel, which will follow from the ending of the first film, where the chickens have settled into their new safe area. Molly, the chick of Ginger and Rocky, begins to outgrow the area, just as word of a new threat to the chickens arrives. Principal photography was expected to commence in 2021.

Aardman said that Gibson would not return as Rocky. Although no explanation was provided by the producers, it was speculated that the decision was made after Winona Ryder accused Gibson of making an antisemitic joke to her, while attending a party in 1995. In July 2020, Sawalha revealed Aardman's intention to recast her role of Ginger, saying her voice now sounded too old, and commented "I have officially been plucked, stuffed & roasted". The decision was met with widespread criticism with some finding the decision ageist.

In January 2023, the title was revealed as Chicken Run: Dawn of the Nugget and was announced for a 10 November 2023 release on Netflix. Zachary Levi, Thandiwe Newton, Romesh Ranganathan and Daniel Mays were revealed to be replacing Gibson, Sawalha, Spall and Daniels as the voices of Rocky, Ginger, Nick and Fetcher; David Bradley will voice Fowler due to Whitrow's death in 2017, while Horrocks, Staunton and Ferguson will reprise their roles as Babs, Bunty and Mac. Bella Ramsey has been cast as Molly, while Nick Mohammed and Josie Sedgwick-Davies will voice two new characters, Dr. Fry and Frizzle, respectively.

Video game 

Chicken Run is a stealth-based 3-D platformer based on the movie. It was released in November 2000 on most consoles. The game is a loose parody of the film The Great Escape, which is set during World War II.

See also 

 Lists of animated feature films
 List of stop motion films
 Colditz Cock, a glider built by British prisoners of war for an escape attempt during World War II

References

External links 

 
 
 
 

 
2000 films
2000 animated films
2000 comedy films
2000 directorial debut films
2000s adventure comedy films
2000s American animated films
2000s children's adventure films
2000s children's comedy films
2000s stop-motion animated films
Aardman Animations films
American adventure comedy films
American aviation films
American children's animated adventure films
American children's animated comedy films
Animated films about aviation
Animated films about birds
Best Animated Feature Broadcast Film Critics Association Award winners
British aviation films
British children's adventure films
British children's animated films
British children's comedy films
British prison films
French animated films
French children's films
Clay animation films
DreamWorks Animation animated films
DreamWorks Pictures films
Environmental films
Films about animal rights
Animated films about chickens
Films about farmers
Films about mice and rats
Films directed by Nick Park
Films directed by Peter Lord
Films produced by Nick Park
Films produced by Peter Lord
Films scored by Harry Gregson-Williams
Films scored by John Powell
Films set on farms
Films set in Yorkshire
Films with screenplays by Karey Kirkpatrick
Pathé films
Allied Filmmakers films
2000s English-language films
2000s American films
2000s British films
2000s French films

ext:Chicken Run